= Present Age (magazine) =

American magazine

Present Age was an American quarterly magazine published from 1870 to 1872 in New Orleans, by James E. Waldo.
